Moses Dresser Phillips (May 15, 1813 - August 20, 1859) was an American publisher of books and magazines best known for creating The Atlantic Monthly.

Biography
Phillips was born in Charlton, Massachusetts. At age 18 he moved to Worcester, Massachusetts, where he served as a bookstore clerk in the shop of Clarendon Harris.
In 1835 he established his own bookstore in partnership with William Lincoln, and around 1843, in partnership with Charles Sampson, he founded the Boston publishing house of Phillips & Sampson (later Phillips, Sampson & Company). Phillips told an anecdote, recounted by Edward Everett Hale, of their first orders from San Francisco during the Gold Rush year of 1849: "So many hundred packs of 'Highland' cards, so many of the 'True Thomas' cards, and so on till the box was nearly full, and then 'one dozen Bibles.'" This was seed corn, as he said. By 1852 or 1853, the orders were for "Four hundred Byron's Poems, four hundred Scott's Poems, one hundred Cowper's Poems" and so on in large shipments.

In the autumn of 1857, Phillips and Sampson determined to create and publish The Atlantic Monthly. Their plan was launched in a dinner-party, as described in a letter by Phillips:

At that dinner he announced his idea for a magazine:

The first issue of The Atlantic was published in November 1857, and quickly gained fame as one of the finest magazines in the English-speaking world.

Phillips died at age 46 in his house in Brookline, Massachusetts and is buried in Rural Cemetery in Worcester, Massachusetts.

References

External links

American publishers (people)
1813 births
1859 deaths
19th-century American businesspeople
Phillips family (New England)